Peter Larsson may refer to:

Peter Larsson (footballer, born 1961), Swedish footballer
Peter Larsson (footballer, born 1984), Swedish footballer
Peter Larsson (cross-country skier) (born 1978), Swedish cross country skier
Peter Larsson (ice hockey), ice hockey player in 1999–2000 Deutsche Eishockey Liga season

See also
Peter Larsen (disambiguation)
Peter Larson (disambiguation)